Michael G. Sullivan is a Canadian biologist specializing in fisheries, wildlife and land use management. He is known for his role in the active recovery of Alberta's collapsed walleye population. He currently serves as the provincial fish science specialist for Alberta Environment and Parks

Biography

Career 
In 1983, Sullivan started as a junior biologist with the Government of Alberta. He currently serves as the provincial fish science specialist for Alberta Environment and Parks. His main area of expertise is in fisheries management, but he has also contributed to caribou studies and management in Alberta and British Columbia. He was part of the team that worked on restoring Alberta's collapsed walleye populations

In the mid-1990s Sullivan began serving as an advisor to Parks Canada. in the western national parks. He has is a member of the North American Journal of Fisheries Management Editorial board and currently sits as the associate editor. He is adjunct professor both at the University of Alberta and Royal Roads University, where he has acted as a supervisor to graduate students. He serves on various projects at the ALCES, a group which provides landuse and resource solutions

Significant contributions 
Sullivan was part of the team that helped restore Alberta fish populations for traditional use. Native fish in Alberta were over-harvested for decades, and walleye, pike, whitefish, etc. populations are still recovering. Since Alberta is somewhat scarce in waterbodies compared to the rest of Canada (estimated 315 anglers per lake, compared to 2 in SK, 2 in MN, and 6 in ON), and has a relatively short fishing season, the fisheries are vulnerable. Sullivan was part of the team of biologists at the Government of Alberta that came up with a framework with 4 main management objectives related to: i) first nations, ii) ecosystem iii) fish habitat and iv) recreation fisheries

Sullivan also reaches many people through the news, online videos   and community meetings

Honours 
In 2019, Sullivan received the Award of Excellence from the Fisheries Management Section. of the American Fisheries Society. In 2015 he received the Alberta Chapter of Wildlife Outreach Award

Volunteerism 
Through his career with the Alberta Government, Sullivan has completed numerous occupational health and safety training courses. These safety training courses are applied volunteering at local events and as a volunteer member of the Canadian Ski Patrol. He volunteers at the River Edge Ultra Running Race, a 100 km running race near Devon where runners wade to an island on the North Saskatchewan River, requiring (potential) river rescuers

Selected publications

Journal publications 

 
 
 
 
 Macpherson, Laura, Sullivan, Michael G., Foote, Lee and Stevens, Cameron E. 2011. “How Road Networks Affect Stream Fish Assemblages.” In proceedings of the American Fisheries Society 140th Annual Meeting.

Textbook publications 

 Sullivan, Michael G., Propst, David, and Gould, Bill. 2009 “Fish of the Rockies: including best fishing sites.” Edmonton, AB: Lone Pine Publishing
 Joynt, Amanda, and Sullivan, Michael G. 2003. “ Fish of Alberta” Edmonton, AB: Lone Pine Publishing

References and links 

Living people
Canadian biologists
Year of birth missing (living people)